Abraham Cole ( – April 29, 1890) was an American politician from Maryland. He served as a member of the Maryland House of Delegates, representing Harford County, from 1846 to 1849.

Career
Cole served as a member of the Maryland House of Delegates, representing Harford County, from 1846 to 1849. He was a Democrat.

Personal life
Cole married Sarah E. His wife died in March 1890. They had two sons and two daughters, Cornelius, Henry, Mrs. William Reasin and Fannie.

Cole died on April 29, 1890, at the age of 82, at his home, New Park Farm, near Michaelsville, Maryland. He was buried at Spesutia Church in Perryman.

References

Year of birth uncertain
1800s births
1890 deaths
People from Harford County, Maryland
Maryland Democrats
Members of the Maryland House of Delegates
19th-century American politicians